Yngve Andersen (born 6 June 1948) is a Norwegian footballer. He played in two matches for the Norway national football team in 1978.

References

External links
 
 

1948 births
Living people
Norwegian footballers
Norway international footballers
Place of birth missing (living people)
Association football midfielders
Vålerenga Fotball players